Canada  competed at the 2019 World Aquatics Championships in Gwangju, South Korea from 12 to 28 July.

Medalists

Artistic swimming

Canada's artistic swimming team consisted of 12 athletes (12 female).

Women

 Legend: (R) = Reserve Athlete

Diving

Canada has entered 10 divers.

Men

Women

Mixed

High diving

Canada qualified two female high divers.

Open water swimming

Canada qualified four male and two female open water swimmers.

Men

Women

Mixed

Swimming

Canada has entered 25 swimmers.

Men

Women

Mixed

 Legend: (*) = Swimmers who participated in the heat only.

Water polo

Women's tournament

Team roster

Jessica Gaudreault (C)
Krystina Alogbo
Axelle Crevier
Emma Wright
Monika Eggens
Kelly Mckee
Joëlle Békhazi
Elyse Lemay-Lavoie
Hayley McKelvey
Kyra Christmas
Kindred Paul
Shae Fournier
Claire Wright
Coach: David Paradelo

Group B

Playoffs

9th–12th place semifinals

Ninth place game

References

World Aquatics Championships
2019
Nations at the 2019 World Aquatics Championships